Break the Rules is the fifth studio album by Japanese recording artist Namie Amuro, released on December 20, 2000 through Avex Trax. It was released only 11 months after her previous album Genius 2000 (2000), and was her final album to date with her long-time producer Tetsuya Komuro, the album generally receive positive reviews by the critics, it was the shortlisted the Asia Association Music Prize Award.

Break the Rules debuted at number two on the Oricon Weekly Albums Chart with 334,520 copies sold, the lowest first week sales of her career at that point. It also became her first studio album to not top the chart. Due to the small space in time between the release of this album and her last album, only two singles precede it.

The album was certified Platinum by the RIAJ.

Background and packaging 
Break the Rules is her second album to feature songs written and produced by American music producer, Dallas Austin. His role in this album, however, is much smaller than the last. For Genius 2000, Austin produced half of the album; with this album he only produced four songs. The majority of the tracks features compositions from Amuro's main producer, Tetsuya Komuro.

First editions of the album came in special packaging. The booklet was presented as a foldout poster featuring Amuro looking out of an airplane window. It also came with a foldout card of photos depicting Namie in different locations around America, mostly New York City and Los Angeles. The album was housed in a transparent slip case with the phrase "break the rules" in pink running diagonally across the front and back of it.

Singles and other promotion detail 
The songs "Think of Me" and "No More Tears" were released as a double A-side single shortly after the release of the album. A video was made for "Think of Me" in New York during photo sessions for the album artwork. No video was made for "No More Tears." Previous songs that appear on the album have all been slightly modified. These songs include "Never End", "Please Smile Again" and "Cross Over". "Cross Over" features a rap verse from Poppa LQ. Unique among Amuro albums is that it features her first attempt at singing a song entirely in English on the track "Looking for You".

Track listing

Personnel 
 Namie Amuro – vocals, background vocals
 Poppa L.Q. – vocals
 Terry Bradford – background vocals
 Alex Brown – background vocals
 Andy Caine – background vocals
 Jennifer Carr – background vocals
 Debra Killings – background vocals
 Maxayn Lewis – background vocals
 Oleatha "Butta" Richie – background vocals
 Juliet Roberts – background vocals
 Will Wheaton Jr. – background vocals
 Ken Kimura – guitar
 Tetsuya Komuro – acoustic piano, keyboards, synthesizer
 Kazuhiro Matsuo – acoustic guitar

Production
 Producers – Dallas Austin, Ricciano Lumpkins, Tetsuya Komuro
 Arrangement – Dallas Austin, Tetsuya Komuro
 Mixing – Dave Darlington, Kevin "KD" Davis, Chris Puram, Alvin Seights 
 Midi & Sound Design – Rick Sheppard
 Vocal Direction – Kenji Sano
 Remixing – Junior Vasquez (No More Tears Remix)
 Photography – Shoji Uchida
 Art Direction – Tycoon Graphics

Charts 
Album - Oricon Sales Chart (Japan)

Singles - Oricon Sales Chart (Japan)

Total Single Sales:  969,940

Total Album and Single Sales:  1,304,460

References

Namie Amuro albums
2000 albums
Albums produced by Dallas Austin
Albums produced by Tetsuya Komuro
Avex Group albums